The Azerbaijan State Song Theatre named after Rashid Behbudov is located in Azerbaijan's capital, Baku, on Rashid Behbudov Street, and is named after Rashid Behbudov, who founded it in 1968. 

The theatre building was originally built as a synagogue in 1901. It is in the Greek Revival style, with an Ionic order portico, and in the ornamented pediment there is a central lyre where a representation of the Tablets of Stone once featured.

The theatre's repertoire consists of folk songs, mugams and tasnifs, as well as works of national composers like Uzeyir Hajibeyov, Gara Garayev, Fikrat Amirov and Tofig Guliyev. Popular artists, such as Zaur Rzayev, Ilhama Guliyeva, Mubariz Taghiyev, Azar Zeynalov, Zohra Abdullayeva and Aybaniz Hashimova, worked in the theatre.

References 

Theatres in Baku
Buildings and structures in Baku
1968 establishments in the Soviet Union
Tourist attractions in Baku
Former synagogues